Richard Kenneth Djerf (born November 6, 1969) is an American mass murderer, currently on death row in Florence, Arizona.

Overview
On September 14, 1993, Djerf killed Albert Luna Sr., 46; his wife, Patricia, 40; and their two children, 18-year-old Rochelle, whom he also raped; and 5-year-old Damien over the course of seven hours. The family's only surviving member was Albert Luna Jr., a former friend of Djerf. The murders, he would later brag to others, were in retaliation for the former friend allegedly stealing several electronic items and a firearm from Djerf's apartment.

Djerf admitted to the crimes and pled guilty at trial.

Significance
The case is significant for multiple reasons.  First, under a rule 11 law Djerf insisted on his right to fire his legal counsel and represent himself.  Djerf had to fight for the right to legally represent himself in court so that he could forgo a trial and enter a guilty plea.  His case is often cited as a self-representation case where it is not in the client's best interest to represent themselves as long as the person can prove competency.

The crime
Djerf believed Albert Luna, Jr., the family's eldest son, had robbed his house. Luna confessed to the crime during Djerf's trial. 

On September 14, 1993, Djerf showed up at the Luna home with flowers and then forced himself in at gunpoint. Patricia Luna and her 5-year-old son Damien were at home. Djerf secured Mrs. Luna and her son by tying their arms and legs and gagging them. When Rochelle Luna arrived several hours later, Djerf took her to her bedroom, where he raped and killed her. When Albert Luna, Sr. arrived home, Djerf forced him into his bedroom at gunpoint. Djerf handcuffed Mr. Luna to a bed, smashed his head with a baseball bat, and then removed the handcuffs because he believed Mr. Luna was dead. Djerf then returned to the kitchen with Mrs. Luna and Damien. Mr. Luna regained consciousness and charged Djerf. Djerf killed Mr. Luna, then shot Mrs. Luna and Damien in the head.

Before he left, Djerf spread gasoline around the house. He then turned on the stove and left a pizza box on the burner, but the house didn't burn.

Verdict
The judge who sentenced Djerf to death in 1996 said that Djerf had "relished" the time he spent killing the Luna family to get revenge against his friend for burglarizing his apartment.

There were four death sentence rulings. Djerf scoffed at the multiple death sentences, saying, "They can only kill me once."

The Arizona Supreme Court rejected Djerf's appeal, and the U.S. Supreme Court has refused to hear it. The Arizona Supreme Court issued a warrant of execution in February 2002. The U.S. District Court issued a stay one month later.

Djerf continued his appeals to the federal courts. Under Ring v. Arizona the Supreme Court ruled that only a jury, not a judge, could hand down the death penalty. That put Djerf's case on permanent hold until the Supreme Court clarified its ruling in Schriro v. Summerlin. All three far-reaching cases—Ring, Summerlin, and Djerf—are Arizona capital murder cases.

In April 2017, the district court dismissed all of his claims, and Djerf appealed the dismissal. On July 24, 2019, the Ninth Circuit Court of Appeals affirmed the district court's dismissal. As of April 2021, Djerf is one of the 20 Arizona death row inmates who has exhausted all appeals.

A book and documentary are underway about Djerf, his crime, and his time on death row. He is incarcerated at Arizona State Prison Complex – Eyman on death row.

See also
 List of death row inmates in the United States

References

External links
 Djerf Supreme Court Decision
 Pictures of Djerf's artwork

1969 births
1993 murders in the United States
Living people
American mass murderers
American rapists
American murderers of children
People from Phoenix, Arizona
American prisoners sentenced to death
Prisoners sentenced to death by Arizona
American people convicted of murder
People convicted of murder by Arizona
Family murders